Kevin Messick (born August 21, 1966) is an American film producer. He was nominated for two Academy Awards in the category Best Picture for the films Vice and Don't Look Up.

Selected filmography 
 Surviving the Game (1994)
 Batman Forever (1995)
 The Babysitter (1995)
 Truth or Consequences, N.M. (1997)
 A Lot like Love (2005)
 The Answer Man (2009)
 The Goods: Live Hard, Sell Hard (2009)
 The Other Guys (2010)
 Casa de mi padre (2012)
 Jack Reacher (2012)
 Hansel & Gretel: Witch Hunters (2013)
 Anchorman 2: The Legend Continues (2013)
 Tammy (2014)
 Get Hard (2015)
 The Big Short (2015)
 Daddy's Home (2015)
 The Boss (2016)
 Jack Reacher: Never Go Back (2016)
 Masterminds (2016)
 Daddy's Home 2 (2017)
 Ibiza (2018)
 Vice (2018; co-nominated with Dede Gardner, Jeremy Kleiner and Adam McKay)
 Don't Look Up (2021; co-nominated with Adam McKay)
 Fresh (2022)

References

External links 

1966 births
Living people
People from California
American film producers
American television producers
Film producers from California
Television producers from California